van Velthoven or Vanvelthoven is a surname. Notable people with the surname include:

Bas van Velthoven (born 1985), Dutch swimmer
Jaak van Velthoven, Belgian motorcycle racer
Peter Vanvelthoven (born 1962), Belgian politician

Surnames of Dutch origin